

Events
Louis R. Elfman, a former lieutenant of Philadelphia bootlegger Maxie "Boo-Boo" Hoff, becomes a government witness.
April 21 – Illinois gangster Charles Birger is executed for the ordered murder of West City, Illinois Mayor Joe Adams.
June 14- Mafia associate Samuel Stein is charged with killing Kansas City police officer James H. "Happy" Smith.
June 26 – Timothy D. "Big Tim" Murphy is gunned down by assassins as he answered the door at his Chicago home.
July 25 – Salvatore Canale, an associate of Chicago mobster Joe Aiello, is killed outside his home in Chicago.
September 7 – Unione Siciliane President Antonio Lombardo, an advisor to mob boss Al Capone, is killed by several unidentified gunmen.
October 10 – Salvatore "Toto" D'Aquila, founder of the present day Gambino crime family and reportedly held the title of "capo di tutti capi" (or "boss of all bosses"), is shot and killed by unidentified gunmen.  He is succeeded by Alfred "Al Mineo" Manfredi.
November 4 – Mob financier Arnold Rothstein is shot by an unidentified gunman while at Manhattan's Park-Central Hotel and dies of his wounds at the Polyclinic Hospital the following day. Rothstein's murder would be attributed to his refusal to pay a $320,000 gambling debt from a three-day poker. Rothstein had refused to pay because he said the game was dishonest. George "Hump" McManus, a participant in the game, would be arrested for Rothstein's murder, but later acquitted due to lack of evidence.
December 5 – In a meeting known as the Cleveland Conference, over 20 mobsters are arrested while staying at a Cleveland hotel, including Cleveland, Ohio bootlegger Philip Bacino and New York bootlegger Vince Mangano. Of those in attendance, future mob boss Joe Profaci and mobster Joseph Magliocco, would attend the 1957 Apalachin Conference in New York.

Arts and literature

Births
George Cornell, UK gangster for the Richardson Brothers
John Riggi, Sr. "The Eagle", New Jersey boss involved in northern and central New Jersey waterfront labor racketeering and ally of Simone DeCavalcante
January 23 – Salvatore Lima "Salvo", Italian politician and mafia associate
March 29 – Vincent Gigante "The Chin", Genovese crime family Don
July 13 – Tommaso Buscetta, Sicilian mafioso turned government witness

Deaths
April 21 – Charles Birger, Illinois Prohibition gangster
July 1 – Frankie Yale, New York Black Hand boss, assassinated by Al Capone's hitmen
July 25 – Salvatore Canale, Joe Aiello Gang member
September 7 – Antonio Lombardo, Unione Siciliane President and Al Capone consigliere
October 10 – Salvatore D'Aquila "Toto", Gambino crime family founder and "capo de tutti capi"''
November 4 – Arnold Rothstein "The Brain", New York mobster and gambler, murdered over a debt

References 

Organized crime
Years in organized crime